Fred Stringer was manager of Hull City between September 1914 and July 1916. He succeeded Harry Chapman but was replaced by David Menzies.  He had a win percentage of 51.16% from 43 competitive games: 22 wins, 6 draws and 15 losses. This is the best combined percentage of any Hull City manager.

Hull City A.F.C. managers
Year of birth missing
Year of death missing
Coventry City F.C. directors and chairmen